Ekanit Panya (born 21 October 1999) is a Thai professional footballer who plays as a winger or an attacking midfielder for Thai League 1 club Muangthong United and the Thailand national team.

International career
In September 2017, he won the 2017 AFF U-18 Youth Championship with the Thailand U-19 team.

He was called up to the senior squad for the 2022 FIFA World Cup qualification second round in September 2019.

In 2022, he was called up for the 2022 AFF Championship by Head Coach Alexandré Pölking.

Statistics

International

International Goals

Senior
Scores and results list Thailand's goal tally first.

U23

U21

U19

Honours

Club
Chiangrai United
 Thai League 1: 2019
 Thai FA Cup: 2020–21

International
Thailand U-19
 AFF U-19 Youth Championship : 2017
 Jockey Club Tournament: 2017

Thailand U-23
 Southeast Asian Games Silver medal: 2021
Thailand
 AFF Championship (1): 2022

References

External links
Ekanit Panya at Soccerway

1999 births
Living people
Ekanit Panya
Ekanit Panya
Association football midfielders
Ekanit Panya
Ekanit Panya
Ekanit Panya
Footballers at the 2018 Asian Games
Ekanit Panya
Ekanit Panya
Ekanit Panya
Competitors at the 2021 Southeast Asian Games
Ekanit Panya